Robert Perry Golic (born October 26, 1957) is an American former college and professional football player, television actor, radio personality and sports commentator.

Golic played defensive tackle in the National Football League (NFL) for 14 seasons from 1979 to 1992 with the New England Patriots, Cleveland Browns, and Los Angeles Raiders. He attended the University of Notre Dame, where in football he won a National Championship in 1977 and was recognized as an All-American, and in wrestling was a two-time All-American.

He is the older brother of Mike Golic and uncle of Mike Golic Jr.

Early years
Golic was born in Cleveland, Ohio to Dorothy and Louis Robert "Bob" Golic. The Golics are of Slovenian descent. He has two brothers, Greg and Mike, who also played in the NFL.

Golic's father also went by the nickname Bob; however, they are not named with the generational titles of junior or senior. The elder Golic had a 7-year professional playing career in the Canadian Football League from 1956 to 1962. He played for the Hamilton Tiger-Cats, Montreal Alouettes and Saskatchewan Roughriders. He won the Grey Cup with Hamilton in 1957. Louis Robert Golic died on Friday, June 28, 2013, from heart failure.

Golic attended St. Joseph's High School, at the time an all-boys school in Cleveland, where he played high school football.

Golic was also an accomplished high school wrestler. In 1975, he won the Ohio high school heavyweight championship, beating Harold Smith of Canton McKinley, a future Olympian. He also defeated future NFL player Tom Cousineau from cross-town all-boys school rival St. Edward High School in the tournament semifinals. The match between Golic and Cousineau, who would go on to place third, has been called "one of the most memorable" in the tournament's history. Cousineau would go to be two-time All-American at linebacker at Ohio State. Golic and Cousineau would eventually become teammates in the NFL with the Browns.

College career
Golic received a football scholarship to attend the University of Notre Dame, where he also wrestled. He played for the Notre Dame Fighting Irish football team from 1975 to 1978.  He was also a member of the 1977 NCAA National Champion football team. He was selected as a first-team All-American for the 1977 season, and a unanimous first-team All-American in 1978.

Golic was one of nation's top wrestlers with a three-year record of 54-4-1, finishing third in NCAA meet in 1976 and fourth in 1977. He was named a two-time All-American for Notre Dame as a heavyweight wrestler, capturing fourth place at the 1977 NCAA tournament and third place in 1978. He graduated from Notre Dame in 1979 with a B.A. in Management.

Professional career

Golic was cut by the Patriots going into the 1982 season and claimed on waivers by the Cleveland Browns. The Browns moved him from Linebacker to Nose Tackle.

After seven years with the Browns, Golic relocated to the Los Angeles Raiders through Plan B Free Agency where he played his last four NFL seasons. Golic was a 3-time Pro Bowler (1985, 1986, 1987) while playing with the Cleveland Browns.

Post-playing career
After retiring from football, Golic pursued an acting career. His first appearance was in Coach, playing one of Hayden Fox's former players who went on to an NFL career, but now confiding to Hayden he has cancer due to anabolic steroid use. He then appeared in Saved by the Bell: The College Years, arguably his best known role, playing the role of Mike Rogers, a retired San Francisco 49ers player who became the resident adviser of Cal U, the fictional college attended by the cast. He also appeared in the role for the NBC made-for-TV-movie Saved by the Bell: Wedding in Las Vegas in 1994. From 1996 until 1998, Golic was one of the members of the original Home and Family when it aired on The Family Channel (now known as Freeform).

Golic also hosted sports talk radio programs and did sports reporting for TV stations in Los Angeles; had a stint on Britain's late 80s–90s NFL coverage on Channel 4, opposite presenter Gary Imlach; served as analyst on NBC's NFL coverage from 1994 to 1996; and was a commentator for TNN's coverage of the short-lived XFL in 2001.

In 2004, Golic returned to Northeast Ohio to host the afternoon drive time radio talk show on WNIR 100.1 FM in Akron. He is also a football analyst for WOIO Channel 19 in Cleveland (CBS).

Golic opened a restaurant and bar in downtown Cleveland's Warehouse District (Bob Golic's Sports Bar & Grille). The restaurant closed in June 2014.

Golic was the Vice President of Football Operations for the Lingerie Football League expansion team, the Cleveland Crush until operations were ceased in 2015.

Personal life
Golic is the older brother of Mike Golic, who is also a former NFL football player, and was also a radio host, first as half of ESPN Radio's Mike and Mike, followed by ESPN Radio's Golic and Wingo. His nephews are Mike Golic Jr., himself a former football player turned radio host, and Jake, who entered Notre Dame in 2009.

Mike Golic is a spokesperson for Nutrisystem after losing more than 50 lbs on the diet; however, Bob Golic has outdone his younger brother, dropping more than 140 lbs and returning to his high school weight of 245 lbs.

Golic married Jacqueline Benlein in 1983 and had one child before divorcing in 1992.

Golic currently lives with his family in Solon, Ohio. He is married to Karen Baughman (1996–present), together they have 2 children.

His wife Karen was a ballerina and Raiderette, and he performed The Nutcracker with her at the Akron Civic Theatre in Akron, Ohio in 2006.

References

External links
 
 

1957 births
Living people
American football defensive tackles
American talk radio hosts
American male television actors
American television sports announcers
Cleveland Browns players
Los Angeles Raiders players
National Football League announcers
New England Patriots players
Notre Dame Fighting Irish football players
Notre Dame Fighting Irish wrestlers
XFL (2001) announcers
All-American college football players
American Conference Pro Bowl players
Players of American football from Cleveland
Male actors from Cleveland
Radio personalities from Ohio
American people of Slovenian descent